Wayne Davis may refer to:

 Wayne Davis (cornerback) (1963–2008), American football cornerback
 Wayne Davis (athlete) (born 1991), American then Trinidadian hurdler
 Wayne Davis (linebacker) (born 1964), American football linebacker
 Wayne Davis, a character on the TV series Desperate Housewives

See also
Wayne Davies (disambiguation)